The Union Station, at 801 South 10th Street in Omaha, Nebraska, known also as Union Passenger Terminal, is "one of the finest examples of Art Deco architecture in the Midwest". Designated an Omaha Landmark in 1978, it was listed as "Union Passenger Terminal" on the National Register of Historic Places in 1971, and was designated a National Historic Landmark in 2016. The Union Station is also a contributing property to the Omaha Rail and Commerce Historic District. It was the Union Pacific's first Art Deco railroad station, and the completion of the terminal "firmly established Omaha as an important railroad terminus in the Midwest".

History
The second depot was designed by Chicago architect Charles Sumner Frost, and construction began in October, 1898. It was primarily built from pressed brick made in Omaha, as well as Bedford stone used in the architectural details. A canopy of glass and iron protected passengers from the elements as they entered the station.

Current structure

Designed by Gilbert Stanley Underwood of Los Angeles, the current building features a steel frame structure that is clad with cream-colored glazed terra cotta. Groundbreaking occurred on July 29, 1929, and the building was completed on January 15, 1931. The  cost $3.5 million to build. Of the building's design, Underwood was said to have remarked, "We have tried to express the distinctive character of the railroad: strength, power, masculinity." At its dedication, Carl R. Gray, president of the Union Pacific, declared the station to be, "Dedicated by the railways of Omaha to serve, comfort and convenience of the people."

The construction of the station was preceded by the construction of the Burlington Train Station one block away. Within ten years that station was served by seven railroads. Upon its completion, the Union Station became renowned for its technological innovations, including electric luggage conveyor belts, escalators and extensive lighting throughout the building. Simultaneously, patrons and critics alike appreciated the traditional and lavish attributes of the building, including massive women's restrooms, beautiful marble columns and flooring throughout, and deep oak woodwork surrounding every window and door in the station. During its first year, 1.5 million passengers passed through.

By 1946, 64 steam locomotives were in operation bringing 10,000 passengers daily in and out of the Union Station. However, within a decade everything changed. In 1956 the Chicago and North Western Railroad stopped its line running through Omaha. 1960 saw the exit of Wabash Railroad. In 1965 the Missouri Pacific Railroad and the Chicago Great Western Railway quit running, followed by the Rock Island Railroad in 1969. Passenger service ceased in 1971, and the Union Station was donated to the City of Omaha by the Union Pacific Railroad in 1973.

That year the station quickly became the home of the Durham Museum. The Union Pacific Museum and Archives were also located there. In 1997 the Union Station underwent a renovation that included a  addition and new climate controls for the museum, and today the building is a contributing property to the Omaha Rail and Commerce Historic District, bordering the Old Market Historic District and Omaha's Little Italy.

See also

Omaha Amtrak Station
Omaha Burlington Station
Art deco
Durham Museum
History of Omaha
Landmarks in Omaha

Bibliography
 (1973) Historical Architecture of Omaha by Henry W. Wong.
 (2001) Union Pacific and Omaha Union Station by Carla Johnson.
 (1999) Omaha railroad Stations by John Peterson.

References

External links

 Historic postcard
 
 Architectural sculpture on the station

History of Downtown Omaha, Nebraska
National Register of Historic Places in Omaha, Nebraska
National Historic Landmarks in Nebraska
Former railway stations in Omaha, Nebraska
Railway stations in the United States opened in 1931
Omaha
Art Deco architecture in Nebraska
Art Deco railway stations
Railway stations on the National Register of Historic Places in Nebraska
Gilbert Stanley Underwood buildings
Omaha
Omaha
Omaha
Omaha
Omaha
Railway stations closed in 1971
1931 establishments in Nebraska
Omaha